Antônio José Nogueira Santana, also commonly known as "Tonico" (born 26 July 1972), is a Brazilian former professional basketball player. With the senior Brazilian national basketball team, Santana competed at the 1994 FIBA World Cup, and the 1996 Summer Olympics.

References

External links
 

1972 births
Living people
Brazilian men's basketball players
Olympic basketball players of Brazil
Basketball players at the 1996 Summer Olympics
Sportspeople from Brasília
1994 FIBA World Championship players